Qarwaqucha (Quechua qarwa yellowish, qucha lake, "yellowish lake", also spelled Carhuacocha), also known as Qarwa Punta (Quechua for "yellowish peak (or ridge)", also spelled Carhuapunta) or Flery Punta, is a mountain in the Cordillera Negra in the Andes of Peru. It is located in the Ancash Region, Santa Province, Cáceres del Perú District, near a little lake of that name.

References

See also
List of mountains in the Andes

Mountains of Peru
Mountains of Ancash Region
Lakes of Peru
Lakes of Ancash Region